The Malayan National Liberation Army (MNLA), often mistranslated as the Malayan Races Liberation Army, was a communist guerrilla army, formed on 1st February 1949, that fought for Malayan independence from the British Empire during the Malayan Emergency (1948–1960) and later fought against the Malaysian government in the Communist insurgency in Malaysia (1968–1989). Their leader was a trade union activist known as Chin Peng who had previously been awarded an OBE by the British for waging a guerrilla war against the Japanese occupation of Malaya. Many MNLA fighters were former members of the Malayan Peoples' Anti-Japanese Army (MPAJA) which had been previously trained and funded by the British to fight against Japan during the Second World War.

In 1989 the Malayan Communist Party signed a peace treaty with the Malaysian state and the MNLA and the Party settled in villages in southern Thailand.

History
The MNLA was a guerrilla force created by the Malayan Communist Party (MCP). Many MNLA fighters were previously members of the Malayan People's Anti-Japanese Army (MPAJA), another guerrilla force which the British had secretly trained and armed during World War II to fight against the Japanese occupiers. The Communist Party, which had been banned in the pre-war years, was thereafter granted legal recognition by the British after the war as a reward for its wartime effort but had secretly kept some of the MPAJA's weapons for future use. The MCP used violence to support its union organisation, and the British used restrictions, including banishing key communist leaders not born locally, in an attempt to restrict trade union activity. This mutual antagonism climaxed with an armed revolt in 1948, which resulted in the declaration of a state of emergency in June 1948.

The Malayan Emergency (1948–1960) 
On 16 June 1948, three British plantation managers were assassinated in Perak. In response to these murders the British colonial authorities enacted emergency measures which included outlawing leftist parties and conducting mass arrests of trade union activists and communists. Fleeing the cities, Malayan Communist Party activists and their supporters (including Chin Peng) regrouped deep in the Malayan jungles and founded the Malayan National Liberation Army (MNLA), a guerrilla army to wage a guerilla war against the British authorities. In an attempt to force the British to leave Malaya, the MNLA conducted attacks against soldiers, police, colonial collaborators, and conducted industrial sabotage. During the early years of the Emergency, the MNLA guerrillas would destroy rubber plantations in an attempt to harm the British economy whose war-time debt to the Americans and post-war social programs partially relied on the profits of the Malayan rubber trade. These guerrillas were supported by a network of civilian supporters called the Min Yuen, whose members would live a normal life in towns while gathering intelligence, recruiting new members, spreading propaganda and collecting supplies for the MNLA.

The MNLA allowed people of any race as well as women to join the guerrilla army as any prejudice between race and sex was believed by the MNLA and MCP to be a tool of capitalism to divide the working class. Due to their location deep within Malaya's jungles, the MNLA often came into contact with the aboriginal Orang Asli, recruiting them as trackers and using their villages as a food source. However, despite their attempts to recruit from all ethnic backgrounds, the MNLA membership was still overwhelmingly made up of ethnic Chinese.

Less than a month into the Emergency, Britain's High Commissioner in Malaya Edward Gent died in an airplane collision. In 1951 his replacement, Henry Gurney was assassinated by MNLA guerrillas in an ambush against his convoy near Fraser's Hill resort. The next High Commissioner was Gerald Templer who is credited by many historians as being the most effective in defeating the MNLA guerrillas. Templer oversaw the finalising of the Briggs Plan, the British military strategy to defeat Malaysian guerrillas by forcibly transferring most of Malaysia's ethnic-Chinese population to a series of newly constructed settlements known as "new villages". By early 1952 over 400,000 people (mostly ethnic Chinese) had been moved to the "New villages". Templer then attempted to starve the MNLA out of the jungles by torching farmland, spraying chemical herbicides from airplanes to destroy crops, and enforcing a striction rationing system for Malayan villagers so that they could not share food with MNLA members. In the New village of Tanjung Malim, the rice rations were halved after the population refused to give information on communist activities in the region.

The Briggs Plan and the New Village internment camps had succeeded in separating the civilian population from the MNLA guerrillas in the jungles and severely damaged their ability to continue fighting. The food denial campaign also put great pressure on the MNLA and damaged their ability to conduct assaults against British positions.

The Emergency officially came to an end in 1960, although the MNLA had already been defeated as an effective fighting force for years.

Communist insurgency in Malaysia (1968–1989)
Defeated in the first Malayan emergency and outwitted in Singapore politics by nationalist politician Lee Kuan Yew, the MCP by the mid-1960s was fragmented. However, in 1968 the MNLA reappeared and operated from across the Thai border and carried out ambushes, hit-and-run attacks, as well as laid traps for Malaysian military. The MNLA fought in the highly forested area near the Thai border in the north of the Malay peninsula. The MNLA was not able to reform to its former size and the MCP began recruitment of Thai Malays as well as distributing pamphlets preaching the compatibility between Islam and Communism. The MNLA had some success early on in the insurgency, at one point killing 17 members of the security forces in a single attack. In 1989, the MCP came to the negotiating table and reached an agreement with the Malaysian government which would allow MCP/MNLA members to return to Malaysia if they laid down their arms. Some MCP/MNLA members settled in "peace villages" in Southern Thailand, while others returned to Malaysia. However, Secretary-General of the MCP Chin Peng was subsequently denied the right to return to Malaysia in spite of the agreement between the MCP and the government.

Name and mistranslation
Malayan Races Liberation Army is a translation from the Chinese "" where "" means "nationality" in the ethnic sense. The organization's leader Chin Peng has called this a mistranslation and corrected it to Malayan National Liberation Army (MNLA). The name of the MNLA in Malay could also be translated as the Malayan People's Liberation Army although extant records show that the title Tentera Pembebasan Nasional Malaya or MNLA became the normal self-identity by the 1970s.

References

Communism in Malaysia
Defunct communist militant groups
Military history of Malaysia
Paramilitary organisations based in Malaysia
Malayan Emergency
Military wings of communist parties
1949 establishments in Malaya
1989 disestablishments
Military units and formations established in 1949
Military units and formations disestablished in 1989